Ibn Sina (980 – June 1037 CE), commonly known in the West as Avicenna, was a Persian polymath who is regarded as one of the most significant physicians, astronomers, philosophers, and writers of the Islamic Golden Age, and the father of early modern medicine. Sajjad H. Rizvi has called Avicenna "arguably the most influential philosopher of the pre-modern era". He was a Muslim Peripatetic philosopher influenced by Greek Aristotelian philosophy. Of the 450 works  he is believed to have written, around 240 have survived, including 150 on philosophy and 40 on medicine.

His most famous works are The Book of Healing, a philosophical and scientific encyclopedia, and The Canon of Medicine, a medical encyclopedia which became a standard medical text at many medieval universities and remained in use as late as 1650. Besides philosophy and medicine, Avicenna's corpus includes writings on astronomy, alchemy, geography and geology, psychology, Islamic theology, logic, mathematics, physics, and works of poetry.

Name 
 is a Latin corruption of the Arabic patronym Ibn Sīnā, meaning "Son of Sina". However, Avicenna was not the son but the great-great-grandson of a man named Sina. His formal Arabic name was Abū ʿAlī al-Ḥusayn bin ʿAbdullāh ibn al-Ḥasan bin ʿAlī bin Sīnā al-Balkhi al-Bukhari.

Circumstances 
Avicenna created an extensive corpus of works during what is commonly known as the Islamic Golden Age, in which the translations of Byzantine Greco-Roman, Persian and Indian texts were studied extensively. Greco-Roman (Mid- and Neo-Platonic, and Aristotelian) texts translated by the Kindi school were commented, redacted and developed substantially by Islamic intellectuals, who also built upon Persian and Indian mathematical systems, astronomy, algebra, trigonometry and medicine.

The Samanid dynasty in the eastern part of Persia, Greater Khorasan and Central Asia as well as the Buyid dynasty in the western part of Persia and Iraq provided a thriving atmosphere for scholarly and cultural development. Under the Samanids, Bukhara rivaled Baghdad as a cultural capital of the Islamic world. There, Avicenna had access to the great libraries of Balkh, Khwarezm, Gorgan, Rey, Isfahan and Hamadan.

Various texts (such as the 'Ahd with Bahmanyar) show that Avicenna debated philosophical points with the greatest scholars of the time. Aruzi Samarqandi describes how before Avicenna left Khwarezm he had met Al-Biruni (a famous scientist and astronomer), Abu Nasr Iraqi (a renowned mathematician), Abu Sahl Masihi (a respected philosopher) and Abu al-Khayr Khammar (a great physician). The study of the Quran and the Hadith also thrived, and Islamic philosophy, fiqh and theology (kalaam) were all further developed by Avicenna and his opponents at this time.

Biography

Early life and education 
The village was near the Samanid capital of Bukhara, which was his mother's hometown. His father Abd Allah was a native of the city of Balkh in Tukharistan. An official of the Samanid bureaucracy, he had served as the governor of a village of the royal estate of Harmaytan (near Bukhara) during the reign of Nuh II. Avicenna also had a younger brother. A few years later, the family settled in Bukhara, a center of learning, which attracted many scholars. It was there that Avicenna was educated, which early on was seemingly administered by his father. Although both Avicenna's father and brother had converted to Ismailism, he himself did not follow the faith. He was instead an adherent of the Sunni Hanafi school, which was also followed by the Samanids.

Avicenna was first schooled in the Quran and literature, and by the age of 10, he had memorized the entire Quran. He was later sent by his father to an Indian greengrocer, who taught him arithmetic. Afterwards, he was schooled in Jurisprudence by the Hanafi jurist Ismail al-Zahid. Some time later, Avicenna's father invited the physician and philosopher Abu Abdallah al-Natili to their house to educate Avicenna. Together, they studied the Isagoge of Porphyry (died 305) and possibly the Categories of Aristotle (died 322 BC) as well. After Avicenna had read the Almagest of Ptolemy (died 170) and Euclid's Elements, Natili told him to continue his research independently. By the time Avicenna was eighteen, he was well-educated in Greek sciences. Although Avicenna only mentions Natili as his teacher in his autobiography, he most likely had other teachers as well, such as the physicians Abu Mansur Qumri and Abu Sahl al-Masihi.

Career

In Bukhara and Gurganj 

At the age of seventeen, Avicenna was made a physician of Nuh II. By the time Avicenna was at least 21 years old, his father died. He was subsequently given an administrative post, possibly succeeding his father as the governor of Harmaytan. Avicenna later moved to Gurganj, the capital of Khwarazm, which he reports that he did due to "necessity". The date he went to the place is uncertain, as he reports that he served the Khwarazmshah (ruler) of the region, the Ma'munid Abu al-Hasan Ali. The latter ruled from 997 to 1009, which indicates that Avicenna moved sometime during that period. He may have moved in 999, the year which the Samanid state fell after the Turkic Qarakhanids captured Bukhara and imprisoned the Samanid ruler Abd al-Malik II. Due to his high position and strong connection with the Samanids, Avicenna may have found himself in an unfavorable position after the fall of his suzerain. It was through the minister of Gurganj, Abu'l-Husayn as-Sahi, a patron of Greek sciences, that Avicenna entered into the service of Abu al-Hasan Ali. Under the Ma'munids, Gurganj became a centre of learning, attracting many prominent figures, such as Avicenna and his former teacher Abu Sahl al-Masihi, the mathematician Abu Nasr Mansur, the physician Ibn al-Khammar, and the philologist al-Tha'alibi.

In Gurgan 
Avicenna later moved due to "necessity" once more (in 1012), this time to the west. There he travelled through the Khurasani cities of Nasa, Abivard, Tus, Samangan and Jajarm. He was planning to visit the ruler of the city of Gurgan, the Ziyarid Qabus, a cultivated patron of writing, whose court attracted many distinguished poets and scholars. However, when Avicenna eventually arrived, he discovered that the ruler had been dead since the winter of 1013. Avicenna then left Gurgan for Dihistan, but returned after becoming ill. There he met Abu 'Ubayd al-Juzjani (died 1070) who became his pupil and companion. Avicenna stayed briefly in Gurgan, reportedly serving Qabus' son and successor Manuchihr and resided in the house of a patron.

In Ray and Hamadan 

In , Avicenna went to the city of Ray, where he entered into the service of the Buyid amir (ruler) Majd al-Dawla and his mother Sayyida Shirin, the de facto ruler of the realm. There he served as the physician at the court, treating Majd al-Dawla, who was suffering from melancholia. Avicenna reportedly later served as the "business manager" of Sayyida Shirin in Qazvin and Hamadan, though details regarding this tenure are unclear. During this period, Avicenna finished his Canon of Medicine, and started writing his Book of Healing.

In 1015, during Avicenna's stay in Hamadan, he participated in a public debate, as was custom for newly arrived scholars in western Iran at that time. The purpose of the debate was to examine one's reputation against a prominent local resident. The person whom Avicenna debated against was Abu'l-Qasim al-Kirmani, a member of the school of philosophers of Baghdad. The debate became heated, resulting in Avicenna accusing Abu'l-Qasim of lack of basic knowledge in logic, while Abu'l-Qasim accused Avicenna of impoliteness. After the debate, Avicenna sent a letter to the Baghdad Peripatetics, asking if Abu'l-Qasim's claim that he shared the same opinion as them was true. Abu'l-Qasim later retaliated by writing a letter to an unknown person, in which he made accusations so serious, that Avicenna wrote to a deputy of Majd al-Dawla, named Abu Sa'd, to investigate the matter. The accusation made towards Avicenna may have been the same as he had received earlier, in which he was accused by the people of Hamadan of copying the stylistic structures of the Quran in his Sermons on Divine Unity. The seriousness of this charge, in the words of the historian Peter Adamson, "cannot be underestimated in the larger Muslim culture."

Not long afterwards, Avicenna shifted his allegiance to the rising Buyid amir Shams al-Dawla (the younger brother of Majd al-Dawla), which Adamson suggests was due to Abu'l-Qasim also working under Sayyida Shirin. Avicenna had been called upon by Shams al-Dawla to treat him, but after the latters campaign in the same year against his former ally, the Annazid ruler Abu Shawk, he forced Avicenna to become his vizier. Although Avicenna would sometimes clash with Shams al-Dawla's troops, he remained vizier until the latter died of colic in 1021. Avicenna was asked by Shams al-Dawla's son and successor Sama' al-Dawla to stay as vizier, but instead went into hiding with his patron Abu Ghalib al-Attar, to wait for better opportunities to emerge. It was during this period that Avicenna was secretly in contact with Ala al-Dawla Muhammad, the Kakuyid ruler of Isfahan and uncle of Sayyida Shirin.

It was during his stay at Attar's home that Avicenna completed his Book of Healing, writing 50 pages a day. The Buyid court in Hamadan, particularly the Kurdish vizier Taj al-Mulk, suspected Avicenna of correspondence with Ala al-Dawla, and as result had the house of Attar ransacked and Avicenna imprisoned in the fortress of Fardajan, outside Hamadan. Juzjani blames one of Avicenna's informers for his capture. Avicenna was imprisoned for four months, until Ala al-Dawla captured Hamadan, thus putting an end to Sama al-Dawla's reign.

In Isfahan 

Avicenna was subsequently released, and went to Isfahan, where he was well received by Ala al-Dawla. In the words of Juzjani, the Kakuyid ruler gave Avicenna "the respect and esteem which someone like him deserved." Adamson also says that Avicenna's service under Ala al-Dawla "proved to be the most stable period of his life." Avicenna served as the advisor, if not vizier of Ala al-Dawla, accompanying him in many of his military expeditions and travels. Avicenna dedicated two Persian works to him, a philosophical treatise named Danish-nama-yi Ala'i ("Book of Science for Ala"), and a medical treatise about the pulse.

During the brief occupation of Isfahan by the Ghaznavids in January 1030, Avicenna and Ala al-Dawla relocated to the southwestern Iranian region of Khuzistan, where they stayed until the death of the Ghaznavid ruler Mahmud, which occurred two months later. It was seemingly when Avicenna returned to Isfahan that he started writing his Pointers and Reminders. In 1037, while Avicenna was accompanying Ala al-Dawla to a battle near Isfahan, he was hit by a severe colic, which he had been constantly suffering from throughout his life. He died shortly afterwards in Hamadan, where he was buried.

Philosophy 

Avicenna wrote extensively on early Islamic philosophy, especially the subjects logic, ethics and metaphysics, including treatises named Logic and Metaphysics. Most of his works were written in Arabic—then the language of science in the Middle East—and some in Persian. Of linguistic significance even to this day are a few books that he wrote in nearly pure Persian language (particularly the Danishnamah-yi 'Ala', Philosophy for Ala' ad-Dawla'). Avicenna's commentaries on Aristotle often criticized the philosopher, encouraging a lively debate in the spirit of ijtihad.

Avicenna's Neoplatonic scheme of "emanations" became fundamental in the Kalam (school of theological discourse) in the 12th century.

His Book of Healing became available in Europe in partial Latin translation some fifty years after its composition, under the title Sufficientia, and some authors have identified a "Latin Avicennism" as flourishing for some time, paralleling the more influential Latin Averroism, but suppressed by the Parisian decrees of 1210 and 1215.

Avicenna's psychology and theory of knowledge influenced William of Auvergne, Bishop of Paris and Albertus Magnus, while his metaphysics influenced the thought of Thomas Aquinas.

Metaphysical doctrine 

Early Islamic philosophy and Islamic metaphysics, imbued as it is with Islamic theology, distinguishes more clearly than Aristotelianism between essence and existence. Whereas existence is the domain of the contingent and the accidental, essence endures within a being beyond the accidental. The philosophy of Avicenna, particularly that part relating to metaphysics, owes much to al-Farabi. The search for a definitive Islamic philosophy separate from Occasionalism can be seen in what is left of his work.

Following al-Farabi's lead, Avicenna initiated a full-fledged inquiry into the question of being, in which he distinguished between essence (Mahiat) and existence (Wujud). He argued that the fact of existence cannot be inferred from or accounted for by the essence of existing things, and that form and matter by themselves cannot interact and originate the movement of the universe or the progressive actualization of existing things. Existence must, therefore, be due to an agent-cause that necessitates, imparts, gives, or adds existence to an essence. To do so, the cause must be an existing thing and coexist with its effect.

Avicenna's consideration of the essence-attributes question may be elucidated in terms of his ontological analysis of the modalities of being; namely impossibility, contingency and necessity. Avicenna argued that the impossible being is that which cannot exist, while the contingent in itself (mumkin bi-dhatihi) has the potentiality to be or not to be without entailing a contradiction. When actualized, the contingent becomes a 'necessary existent due to what is other than itself' (wajib al-wujud bi-ghayrihi). Thus, contingency-in-itself is potential beingness that could eventually be actualized by an external cause other than itself. The metaphysical structures of necessity and contingency are different. Necessary being due to itself (wajib al-wujud bi-dhatihi) is true in itself, while the contingent being is 'false in itself' and 'true due to something else other than itself'. The necessary is the source of its own being without borrowed existence. It is what always exists.

The Necessary exists 'due-to-Its-Self', and has no quiddity/essence (mahiyya) other than existence (wujud). Furthermore, It is 'One' (wahid ahad) since there cannot be more than one 'Necessary-Existent-due-to-Itself' without differentia (fasl) to distinguish them from each other. Yet, to require differentia entails that they exist 'due-to-themselves' as well as 'due to what is other than themselves'; and this is contradictory. However, if no differentia distinguishes them from each other, then there is no sense in which these 'Existents' are not one and the same. Avicenna adds that the 'Necessary-Existent-due-to-Itself' has no genus (jins), nor a definition (hadd), nor a counterpart (nadd), nor an opposite (did), and is detached (bari) from matter (madda), quality (kayf), quantity (kam), place (ayn), situation (wad) and time (waqt).

Avicenna's theology on metaphysical issues (ilāhiyyāt) has been criticized by some Islamic scholars, among them al-Ghazali, Ibn Taymiyya and Ibn al-Qayyim. While discussing the views of the theists among the Greek philosophers, namely Socrates, Plato and Aristotle in Al-Munqidh min ad-Dalal ("Deliverance from Error"), al-Ghazali noted that the Greek philosophers "must be taxed with unbelief, as must their partisans among the Muslim philosophers, such as Avicenna and al-Farabi and their likes." He added that "None, however, of the Muslim philosophers engaged so much in transmitting Aristotle's lore as did the two men just mentioned. [...] The sum of what we regard as the authentic philosophy of Aristotle, as transmitted by al-Farabi and Avicenna, can be reduced to three parts: a part which must be branded as unbelief; a part which must be stigmatized as innovation; and a part which need not be repudiated at all."

Argument for God's existence 

Avicenna made an argument for the existence of God which would be known as the "Proof of the Truthful" (Arabic: burhan al-siddiqin). Avicenna argued that there must be a "necessary existent" (Arabic: wajib al-wujud), an entity that cannot not exist and through a series of arguments, he identified it with the Islamic conception of God. Present-day historian of philosophy Peter Adamson called this argument one of the most influential medieval arguments for God's existence, and Avicenna's biggest contribution to the history of philosophy.

Al-Biruni correspondence 
Correspondence between Avicenna (with his student Ahmad ibn 'Ali al-Ma'sumi) and Al-Biruni has survived in which they debated Aristotelian natural philosophy and the Peripatetic school. Abu Rayhan began by asking Avicenna eighteen questions, ten of which were criticisms of Aristotle's On the Heavens.

Theology 
Avicenna was a devout Muslim and sought to reconcile rational philosophy with Islamic theology. His aim was to prove the existence of God and His creation of the world scientifically and through reason and logic. Avicenna's views on Islamic theology (and philosophy) were enormously influential, forming part of the core of the curriculum at Islamic religious schools until the 19th century. Avicenna wrote a number of short treatises dealing with Islamic theology. These included treatises on the prophets (whom he viewed as "inspired philosophers"), and also on various scientific and philosophical interpretations of the Quran, such as how Quranic cosmology corresponds to his own philosophical system. In general these treatises linked his philosophical writings to Islamic religious ideas; for example, the body's afterlife.

There are occasional brief hints and allusions in his longer works, however, that Avicenna considered philosophy as the only sensible way to distinguish real prophecy from illusion. He did not state this more clearly because of the political implications of such a theory, if prophecy could be questioned, and also because most of the time he was writing shorter works which concentrated on explaining his theories on philosophy and theology clearly, without digressing to consider epistemological matters which could only be properly considered by other philosophers.

Later interpretations of Avicenna's philosophy split into three different schools; those (such as al-Tusi) who continued to apply his philosophy as a system to interpret later political events and scientific advances; those (such as al-Razi) who considered Avicenna's theological works in isolation from his wider philosophical concerns; and those (such as al-Ghazali) who selectively used parts of his philosophy to support their own attempts to gain greater spiritual insights through a variety of mystical means. It was the theological interpretation championed by those such as al-Razi which eventually came to predominate in the madrasahs.

Avicenna memorized the Quran by the age of ten, and as an adult, he wrote five treatises commenting on suras from the Quran. One of these texts included the Proof of Prophecies, in which he comments on several Quranic verses and holds the Quran in high esteem. Avicenna argued that the Islamic prophets should be considered higher than philosophers.

Avicenna is generally understood to have been aligned with the Sunni Hanafi school of thought. Avicenna studied Hanafi law, many of his notable teachers were Hanafi jurists, and he served under the Hanafi court of Ali ibn Mamun. Avicenna said at an early age that he remained "unconvinced" by Ismaili missionary attempts to convert him. Medieval historian Ẓahīr al-dīn al-Bayhaqī (d. 1169) also believed Avicenna to be a follower of the Brethren of Purity.

Thought experiments 

While he was imprisoned in the castle of Fardajan near Hamadhan, Avicenna wrote his famous "floating man"—literally falling man—a thought experiment to demonstrate human self-awareness and the substantiality and immateriality of the soul. Avicenna believed his "Floating Man" thought experiment demonstrated that the soul is a substance, and claimed humans cannot doubt their own consciousness, even in a situation that prevents all sensory data input. The thought experiment told its readers to imagine themselves created all at once while suspended in the air, isolated from all sensations, which includes no sensory contact with even their own bodies. He argued that, in this scenario, one would still have self-consciousness. Because it is conceivable that a person, suspended in air while cut off from sense experience, would still be capable of determining his own existence, the thought experiment points to the conclusions that the soul is a perfection, independent of the body, and an immaterial substance. The conceivability of this "Floating Man" indicates that the soul is perceived intellectually, which entails the soul's separateness from the body. Avicenna referred to the living human intelligence, particularly the active intellect, which he believed to be the hypostasis by which God communicates truth to the human mind and imparts order and intelligibility to nature. Following is an English translation of the argument:

However, Avicenna posited the brain as the place where reason interacts with sensation. Sensation prepares the soul to receive rational concepts from the universal Agent Intellect. The first knowledge of the flying person would be "I am," affirming his or her essence. That essence could not be the body, obviously, as the flying person has no sensation. Thus, the knowledge that "I am" is the core of a human being: the soul exists and is self-aware. Avicenna thus concluded that the idea of the self is not logically dependent on any physical thing, and that the soul should not be seen in relative terms, but as a primary given, a substance. The body is unnecessary; in relation to it, the soul is its perfection. In itself, the soul is an immaterial substance.

Principal works

The Canon of Medicine 

Avicenna authored a five-volume medical encyclopedia: The Canon of Medicine (Al-Qanun fi't-Tibb). It was used as the standard medical textbook in the Islamic world and Europe up to the 18th century. The Canon still plays an important role in Unani medicine.

Liber Primus Naturalium 
Avicenna considered whether events like rare diseases or disorders have natural causes. He used the example of polydactyly to explain his perception that causal reasons exist for all medical events. This view of medical phenomena anticipated developments in the Enlightenment by seven centuries.

The Book of Healing

Earth sciences 
Avicenna wrote on Earth sciences such as geology in The Book of Healing. While discussing the formation of mountains, he explained:

Philosophy of science 
In the Al-Burhan (On Demonstration) section of The Book of Healing, Avicenna discussed the philosophy of science and described an early scientific method of inquiry. He discussed Aristotle's Posterior Analytics and significantly diverged from it on several points. Avicenna discussed the issue of a proper methodology for scientific inquiry and the question of "How does one acquire the first principles of a science?" He asked how a scientist would arrive at "the initial axioms or hypotheses of a deductive science without inferring them from some more basic premises?" He explained that the ideal situation is when one grasps that a "relation holds between the terms, which would allow for absolute, universal certainty". Avicenna then added two further methods for arriving at the first principles: the ancient Aristotelian method of induction (istiqra), and the method of examination and experimentation (tajriba). Avicenna criticized Aristotelian induction, arguing that "it does not lead to the absolute, universal, and certain premises that it purports to provide." In its place, he developed a "method of experimentation as a means for scientific inquiry."

Logic 
An early formal system of temporal logic was studied by Avicenna. Although he did not develop a real theory of temporal propositions, he did study the relationship between temporalis and the implication. Avicenna's work was further developed by Najm al-Dīn al-Qazwīnī al-Kātibī and became the dominant system of Islamic logic until modern times. Avicennian logic also influenced several early European logicians such as Albertus Magnus and William of Ockham. Avicenna endorsed the law of non-contradiction proposed by Aristotle, that a fact could not be both true and false at the same time and in the same sense of the terminology used. He stated, "Anyone who denies the law of non-contradiction should be beaten and burned until he admits that to be beaten is not the same as not to be beaten, and to be burned is not the same as not to be burned."

Physics 
In mechanics, Avicenna, in The Book of Healing, developed a theory of motion, in which he made a distinction between the inclination (tendency to motion) and force of a projectile, and concluded that motion was a result of an inclination (mayl) transferred to the projectile by the thrower, and that projectile motion in a vacuum would not cease. He viewed inclination as a permanent force whose effect is dissipated by external forces such as air resistance.

The theory of motion presented by Avicenna was probably influenced by the 6th-century Alexandrian scholar John Philoponus. Avicenna's is a less sophisticated variant of the theory of impetus developed by Buridan in the 14th century. It is unclear if Buridan was influenced by Avicenna, or by Philoponus directly.

In optics, Avicenna was among those who argued that light had a speed, observing that "if the perception of light is due to the emission of some sort of particles by a luminous source, the speed of light must be finite." He also provided a wrong explanation of the rainbow phenomenon. Carl Benjamin Boyer described Avicenna's ("Ibn Sīnā") theory on the rainbow as follows:

In 1253, a Latin text entitled Speculum Tripartitum stated the following regarding Avicenna's theory on heat:

Psychology 
Avicenna's legacy in classical psychology is primarily embodied in the Kitab al-nafs parts of his Kitab al-shifa (The Book of Healing) and Kitab al-najat (The Book of Deliverance). These were known in Latin under the title De Anima (treatises "on the soul"). Notably, Avicenna develops what is called the Flying Man argument in the Psychology of The Cure I.1.7 as defence of the argument that the soul is without quantitative extension, which has an affinity with Descartes's cogito argument (or what phenomenology designates as a form of an "epoche").

Avicenna's psychology requires that connection between the body and soul be strong enough to ensure the soul's individuation, but weak enough to allow for its immortality. Avicenna grounds his psychology on physiology, which means his account of the soul is one that deals almost entirely with the natural science of the body and its abilities of perception. Thus, the philosopher's connection between the soul and body is explained almost entirely by his understanding of perception; in this way, bodily perception interrelates with the immaterial human intellect. In sense perception, the perceiver senses the form of the object; first, by perceiving features of the object by our external senses. This sensory information is supplied to the internal senses, which merge all the pieces into a whole, unified conscious experience. This process of perception and abstraction is the nexus of the soul and body, for the material body may only perceive material objects, while the immaterial soul may only receive the immaterial, universal forms. The way the soul and body interact in the final abstraction of the universal from the concrete particular is the key to their relationship and interaction, which takes place in the physical body.

The soul completes the action of intellection by accepting forms that have been abstracted from matter. This process requires a concrete particular (material) to be abstracted into the universal intelligible (immaterial). The material and immaterial interact through the Active Intellect, which is a "divine light" containing the intelligible forms. The Active Intellect reveals the universals concealed in material objects much like the sun makes colour available to our eyes.

Other contributions

Astronomy and astrology 

Avicenna wrote an attack on astrology titled Resāla fī ebṭāl aḥkām al-nojūm, in which he cited passages from the Quran to dispute the power of astrology to foretell the future. He believed that each planet had some influence on the earth, but argued against astrologers being able to determine the exact effects.

Avicenna's astronomical writings had some influence on later writers, although in general his work could be considered less developed than Alhazen or Al-Biruni. One important feature of his writing is that he considers mathematical astronomy as a separate discipline to astrology. He criticized Aristotle's view of the stars receiving their light from the Sun, stating that the stars are self-luminous, and believed that the planets are also self-luminous. He claimed to have observed Venus as a spot on the Sun. This is possible, as there was a transit on 24 May 1032, but Avicenna did not give the date of his observation, and modern scholars have questioned whether he could have observed the transit from his location at that time; he may have mistaken a sunspot for Venus. He used his transit observation to help establish that Venus was, at least sometimes, below the Sun in Ptolemaic cosmology, i.e. the sphere of Venus comes before the sphere of the Sun when moving out from the Earth in the prevailing geocentric model.

He also wrote the Summary of the Almagest, (based on Ptolemy's Almagest), with an appended treatise "to bring that which is stated in the Almagest and what is understood from Natural Science into conformity". For example, Avicenna considers the motion of the solar apogee, which Ptolemy had taken to be fixed.

Chemistry 
Avicenna was first to derive the attar of flowers from distillation and used steam distillation to produce essential oils such as rose essence, which he used as aromatherapeutic treatments for heart conditions.

Unlike al-Razi, Avicenna explicitly disputed the theory of the transmutation of substances commonly believed by alchemists:

Four works on alchemy attributed to Avicenna were translated into Latin as:
 
 
 
 

 was the most influential, having influenced later medieval chemists and alchemists such as Vincent of Beauvais. However, Anawati argues (following Ruska) that the de Anima is a fake by a Spanish author. Similarly the Declaratio is believed not to be actually by Avicenna. The third work (The Book of Minerals) is agreed to be Avicenna's writing, adapted from the Kitab al-Shifa (Book of the Remedy). Avicenna classified minerals into stones, fusible substances, sulfurs and salts, building on the ideas of Aristotle and Jabir. The epistola de Re recta is somewhat less sceptical of alchemy; Anawati argues that it is by Avicenna, but written earlier in his career when he had not yet firmly decided that transmutation was impossible.

Poetry 
Almost half of Avicenna's works are versified. His poems appear in both Arabic and Persian. As an example, Edward Granville Browne claims that the following Persian verses are incorrectly attributed to Omar Khayyám, and were originally written by Ibn Sīnā:

Legacy

Classical Islamic civilization 
Robert Wisnovsky, a scholar of Avicenna attached to McGill University, says that "Avicenna was the central figure in the long history of the rational sciences in Islam, particularly in the fields of metaphysics, logic and medicine" but that his works didn't only have an influence in these "secular" fields of knowledge alone, as "these works, or portions of them, were read, taught, copied, commented upon, quoted, paraphrased and cited by thousands of post-Avicennian scholars—not only philosophers, logicians, physicians and specialists in the mathematical or exact sciences, but also by those who specialized in the disciplines of ʿilm al-kalām (rational theology, but understood to include natural philosophy, epistemology and philosophy of mind) and usūl al-fiqh (jurisprudence, but understood to include philosophy of law, dialectic, and philosophy of language)."

Middle Ages and Renaissance 

As early as the 14th century when Dante Alighieri depicted him in Limbo alongside the virtuous non-Christian thinkers in his Divine Comedy such as Virgil, Averroes, Homer, Horace, Ovid, Lucan, Socrates, Plato and Saladin. Avicenna has been recognized by both East and West as one of the great figures in intellectual history.  Johannes Kepler cites Avicenna's opinion when discussing the causes of planetary motions in Chapter 2 of Astronomia Nova.

George Sarton, the author of The History of Science, described Avicenna as "one of the greatest thinkers and medical scholars in history" and called him "the most famous scientist of Islam and one of the most famous of all races, places, and times". He was one of the Islamic world's leading writers in the field of medicine.

Along with Rhazes, Abulcasis, Ibn al-Nafis and al-Ibadi, Avicenna is considered an important compiler of early Muslim medicine. He is remembered in the Western history of medicine as a major historical figure who made important contributions to medicine and the European Renaissance. His medical texts were unusual in that where controversy existed between Galen and Aristotle's views on medical matters (such as anatomy), he preferred to side with Aristotle, where necessary updating Aristotle's position to take into account post-Aristotelian advances in anatomical knowledge. Aristotle's dominant intellectual influence among medieval European scholars meant that Avicenna's linking of Galen's medical writings with Aristotle's philosophical writings in the Canon of Medicine (along with its comprehensive and logical organisation of knowledge) significantly increased Avicenna's importance in medieval Europe in comparison to other Islamic writers on medicine. His influence following translation of the Canon was such that from the early fourteenth to the mid-sixteenth centuries he was ranked with Hippocrates and Galen as one of the acknowledged authorities,  ("prince of physicians").

Modern reception 

Institutions in a variety of counties have been named after Avicenna in honour of his scientific accomplishments, including the Avicenna Mausoleum and Museum, Bu-Ali Sina University, Avicenna Research Institute and Ibn Sina Academy of Medieval Medicine and Sciences. There is also a crater on the Moon named Avicenna.

The Avicenna Prize, established in 2003, is awarded every two years by UNESCO and rewards individuals and groups for their achievements in the field of ethics in science.

The Avicenna Directories (2008–15; now the World Directory of Medical Schools) list universities and schools where doctors, public health practitioners, pharmacists and others, are educated. The original project team stated: 

In June 2009, Iran donated a "Persian Scholars Pavilion" to the United Nations Office in Vienna. It now sits in the Vienna International Center.

In popular culture

The 1982 Soviet film Youth of Genius by  recounts Avicenna's younger years. The film is set in Bukhara at the turn of the millennium.

In Louis L'Amour's 1985 historical novel The Walking Drum, Kerbouchard studies and discusses Avicenna's The Canon of Medicine.

In his book The Physician (1988) Noah Gordon tells the story of a young English medical apprentice who disguises himself as a Jew to travel from England to Persia and learn from Avicenna, the great master of his time. The novel was adapted into a feature film, The Physician, in 2013. Avicenna was played by Ben Kingsley.

List of works 
The treatises of Avicenna influenced later Muslim thinkers in many areas including theology, philology, mathematics, astronomy, physics and music. His works numbered almost 450 volumes on a wide range of subjects, of which around 240 have survived. In particular, 150 volumes of his surviving works concentrate on philosophy and 40 of them concentrate on medicine. His most famous works are The Book of Healing, and The Canon of Medicine.

Avicenna wrote at least one treatise on alchemy, but several others have been falsely attributed to him. His Logic, Metaphysics, Physics, and De Caelo, are treatises giving a synoptic view of Aristotelian doctrine, though Metaphysics demonstrates a significant departure from the brand of Neoplatonism known as Aristotelianism in Avicenna's world; Arabic philosophers have hinted at the idea that Avicenna was attempting to "re-Aristotelianise" Muslim philosophy in its entirety, unlike his predecessors, who accepted the conflation of Platonic, Aristotelian, Neo- and Middle-Platonic works transmitted into the Muslim world.

The Logic and Metaphysics have been extensively reprinted, the latter, e.g., at Venice in 1493, 1495 and 1546. Some of his shorter essays on medicine, logic, etc., take a poetical form (the poem on logic was published by Schmoelders in 1836). Two encyclopedic treatises, dealing with philosophy, are often mentioned. The larger, Al-Shifa' (Sanatio), exists nearly complete in manuscript in the Bodleian Library and elsewhere; part of it on the De Anima appeared at Pavia (1490) as the Liber Sextus Naturalium, and the long account of Avicenna's philosophy given by Muhammad al-Shahrastani seems to be mainly an analysis, and in many places a reproduction, of the Al-Shifa'. A shorter form of the work is known as the An-najat (Liberatio). The Latin editions of part of these works have been modified by the corrections which the monastic editors confess that they applied.

Avicenna's works further include:
 Sirat al-shaykh al-ra'is (The Life of Avicenna), ed. and trans. WE. Gohlman, Albany, NY: State University of New York Press, 1974. (The only critical edition of Avicenna's autobiography, supplemented with material from a biography by his student Abu 'Ubayd al-Juzjani. A more recent translation of the Autobiography appears in D. Gutas, Avicenna and the Aristotelian Tradition: Introduction to Reading Avicenna's Philosophical Works, Leiden: Brill, 1988; second edition 2014.)
 Al-isharat wa al-tanbihat (Remarks and Admonitions), ed. S. Dunya, Cairo, 1960; parts translated by S.C. Inati, Remarks and Admonitions, Part One: Logic, Toronto, Ont.: Pontifical Institute for Mediaeval Studies, 1984, and Ibn Sina and Mysticism, Remarks and Admonitions: Part 4, London: Kegan Paul International, 1996.
 Al-Qanun fi'l-tibb (The Canon of Medicine), ed. I. a-Qashsh, Cairo, 1987. (Encyclopedia of medicine.) manuscript, Latin translation, Flores Avicenne, Michael de Capella, 1508, Modern text. Ahmed Shawkat Al-Shatti, Jibran Jabbur.
 Risalah fi sirr al-qadar (Essay on the Secret of Destiny), trans. G. Hourani in Reason and Tradition in Islamic Ethics, Cambridge: Cambridge University Press, 1985.
 Danishnama-i 'ala'i (The Book of Scientific Knowledge), ed. and trans. P. Morewedge, The Metaphysics of Avicenna, London: Routledge and Kegan Paul, 1973.
 Kitab al-Shifa''' (The Book of Healing). (Avicenna's major work on philosophy. He probably began to compose al-Shifa' in 1014, and completed it in 1020.) Critical editions of the Arabic text have been published in Cairo, 1952–83, originally under the supervision of I. Madkour.
 Kitab al-Najat (The Book of Salvation), trans. F. Rahman, Avicenna's Psychology: An English Translation of Kitab al-Najat, Book II, Chapter VI with Historical-philosophical Notes and Textual Improvements on the Cairo Edition, Oxford: Oxford University Press, 1952. (The psychology of al-Shifa'.) (Digital version of the Arabic text)
 Risala fi'l-Ishq (A Treatise on Love). Translated by Emil L. Fackenheim.

 Persian works 

Avicenna's most important Persian work is the Danishnama-i 'Alai ("the Book of Knowledge for [Prince] 'Ala ad-Daulah"). Avicenna created new scientific vocabulary that had not previously existed in Persian. The Danishnama covers such topics as logic, metaphysics, music theory and other sciences of his time. It has been translated into English by Parwiz Morewedge in 1977. The book is also important in respect to Persian scientific works.Andar Danesh-e Rag ("On the Science of the Pulse") contains nine chapters on the science of the pulse and is a condensed synopsis.

Persian poetry from Avicenna is recorded in various manuscripts and later anthologies such as Nozhat al-Majales.

 See also 

 Al-Qumri (possibly Avicenna's teacher)
 Abdol Hamid Khosro Shahi (Iranian theologian)
 Mummia (Persian medicine)
 Eastern philosophy
 Iranian philosophy
 Islamic philosophy
 Contemporary Islamic philosophy
 Science in the medieval Islamic world
 List of scientists in medieval Islamic world
 Sufi philosophy
 Science and technology in Iran
 Ancient Iranian medicine
 List of pre-modern Iranian scientists and scholars

Namesakes of Ibn Sina

 Ibn Sina Academy of Medieval Medicine and Sciences in Aligarh
 Avicenna Bay in Antarctica
 Avicenna (crater) on the far side of the Moon
 Avicenna Cultural and Scientific Foundation
 Avicenne Hospital in Paris, France
 Avicenna International College in Budapest, Hungary
 Avicenna Mausoleum (complex dedicated to Avicenna) in Hamadan, Iran
 Avicenna Research Institute in Tehran, Iran
 Avicenna Tajik State Medical University in Dushanbe, Tajikistan
 Bu-Ali Sina University in Hamedan, Iran
 Ibn Sina Peak – named after the Scientist, on the Kyrgyzstan–Tajikistan border
 Ibn Sina Foundation in Houston, Texas
 Ibn Sina Hospital, Baghdad, Iraq
 Ibn Sina Hospital, Istanbul, Turkey
 Ibn Sina Medical College Hospital, Dhaka, Bangladesh
 Ibn Sina University Hospital of Rabat-Salé at Mohammed V University in Rabat, Morocco
 Ibne Sina Hospital, Multan, Punjab, Pakistan
 International Ibn Sina Clinic, Dushanbe, Tajikistan

 References 
Citations

Sources

 
 
 
 
 
 
 
 
 
 
 
 
 
 
 
 
  
 
 
 
 
 

 Further reading 

 Encyclopedic articles 
 
 
 
 
 
 
  (PDF version)
 Avicenna entry by Sajjad H. Rizvi in the Internet Encyclopedia of Philosophy Primary literature 
 For an old list of other extant works, C. Brockelmann's Geschichte der arabischen Litteratur (Weimar 1898), vol. i. pp. 452–458. (XV. W.; G. W. T.)
 For a current list of his works see A. Bertolacci (2006) and D. Gutas (2014) in the section "Philosophy".
 
 
 Avicenne: Réfutation de l'astrologie. Edition et traduction du texte arabe, introduction, notes et lexique par Yahya Michot. Préface d'Elizabeth Teissier (Beirut-Paris: Albouraq, 2006) .
 William E. Gohlam (ed.), The Life of Ibn Sina. A Critical Edition and Annotated Translation, Albany, State of New York University Press, 1974.
 For Ibn Sina's life, see Ibn Khallikan's Biographical Dictionary, translated by de Slane (1842); F. Wüstenfeld's Geschichte der arabischen Aerzte und Naturforscher (Göttingen, 1840).
 Madelung, Wilferd and Toby Mayer (ed. and tr.), Struggling with the Philosopher: A Refutation of Avicenna's Metaphysics. A New Arabic Edition and English Translation of Shahrastani's Kitab al-Musara'a.

 Secondary literature 
 
 This is, on the whole, an informed and good account of the life and accomplishments of one of the greatest influences on the development of thought both Eastern and Western. ... It is not as philosophically thorough as the works of D. Saliba, A.M. Goichon, or L. Gardet, but it is probably the best essay in English on this important thinker of the Middle Ages. (Julius R. Weinberg, The Philosophical Review, Vol. 69, No. 2, Apr. 1960, pp. 255–259)
 
 This is a distinguished work which stands out from, and above, many of the books and articles which have been written in this century on Avicenna (Ibn Sīnā) (980–1037). It has two main features on which its distinction as a major contribution to Avicennan studies may be said to rest: the first is its clarity and readability; the second is the comparative approach adopted by the author. ... (Ian Richard Netton, Journal of the Royal Asiatic Society, Third Series, Vol. 4, No. 2, July 1994, pp. 263–264)
 
 Y.T. Langermann (ed.), Avicenna and his Legacy. A Golden Age of Science and Philosophy, Brepols Publishers, 2010, 
 For a new understanding of his early career, based on a newly discovered text, see also: Michot, Yahya, Ibn Sînâ: Lettre au vizir Abû Sa'd. Editio princeps d'après le manuscrit de Bursa, traduction de l'arabe, introduction, notes et lexique (Beirut-Paris: Albouraq, 2000) .
 
 This German publication is both one of the most comprehensive general introductions to the life and works of the philosopher and physician Avicenna (Ibn Sīnā, d. 1037) and an extensive and careful survey of his contribution to the history of science. Its author is a renowned expert in Greek and Arabic medicine who has paid considerable attention to Avicenna in his recent studies. ... (Amos Bertolacci, Isis, Vol. 96, No. 4, December 2005, p. 649)
 
 
 
 
 
 
 Shaikh al Rais Ibn Sina (Special number) 1958–59, Ed. Hakim Syed Zillur Rahman, Tibbia College Magazine, Aligarh Muslim University, Aligarh, India.

 Medicine 
 Browne, Edward G. Islamic Medicine. Fitzpatrick Lectures Delivered at the Royal College of Physicians in 1919–1920, reprint: New Delhi: Goodword Books,  2001. 
 Pormann, Peter & Savage-Smith, Emilie. Medieval Islamic Medicine, Washington: Georgetown University Press, 2007.
 Prioreschi, Plinio. Byzantine and Islamic Medicine, A History of Medicine, Vol. 4, Omaha: Horatius Press, 2001.
 Syed Ziaur Rahman. Pharmacology of Avicennian Cardiac Drugs (Metaanalysis of researches and studies in Avicennian Cardiac Drugs along with English translation of Risalah al Adwiya al Qalbiyah), Ibn Sina Academy of Medieval Medicine and Sciences, Aligarh, India, 2020 

 Philosophy 
 Amos Bertolacci, The Reception of Aristotle's Metaphysics in Avicenna's Kitab al-Sifa'. A Milestone of Western Metaphysical Thought, Leiden: Brill 2006, (Appendix C contains an Overview of the Main Works by Avicenna on Metaphysics in Chronological Order).
 Dimitri Gutas, Avicenna and the Aristotelian Tradition: Introduction to Reading Avicenna's Philosophical Works, Leiden, Brill 2014, second revised and expanded edition (first edition: 1988), including an inventory of Avicenna' Authentic Works.
 Andreas Lammer: The Elements of Avicenna's Physics. Greek Sources and Arabic Innovations. Scientia graeco-arabica 20. Berlin / Boston: Walter de Gruyter, 2018.
 Jon McGinnis and David C. Reisman (eds.) Interpreting Avicenna: Science and Philosophy in Medieval Islam: Proceedings of the Second Conference of the Avicenna Study Group, Leiden: Brill, 2004.
  Michot, Jean R., La destinée de l'homme selon Avicenne, Louvain: Aedibus Peeters, 1986, .
 Nader El-Bizri, The Phenomenological Quest between Avicenna and Heidegger, Binghamton, N.Y.: Global Publications SUNY, 2000 (reprinted by SUNY Press in 2014 with a new Preface).
 Nader El-Bizri, "Avicenna and Essentialism," Review of Metaphysics, Vol. 54 (June 2001), pp. 753–778.
 Nader El-Bizri, "Avicenna's De Anima between Aristotle and Husserl," in The Passions of the Soul in the Metamorphosis of Becoming, ed. Anna-Teresa Tymieniecka, Dordrecht: Kluwer, 2003, pp. 67–89.
 Nader El-Bizri, "Being and Necessity: A Phenomenological Investigation of Avicenna's Metaphysics and Cosmology," in Islamic Philosophy and Occidental Phenomenology on the Perennial Issue of Microcosm and Macrocosm, ed. Anna-Teresa Tymieniecka, Dordrecht: Kluwer, 2006, pp. 243–261.
 Nader El-Bizri, 'Ibn Sīnā's Ontology and the Question of Being', Ishrāq: Islamic Philosophy Yearbook 2 (2011), 222–237
 Nader El-Bizri, 'Philosophising at the Margins of 'Sh'i Studies': Reflections on Ibn Sīnā's Ontology', in The Study of Sh'i Islam. History, Theology and Law, eds. F. Daftary and G. Miskinzoda (London: I.B. Tauris, 2014), pp. 585–597.
 Reisman, David C. (ed.), Before and After Avicenna: Proceedings of the First Conference of the Avicenna Study Group'',  Leiden: Brill, 2003.

External links 

 
 
 
 
 
 
 
 
 
 Avicenna (Ibn-Sina) on the Subject and the Object of Metaphysics with a list of translations of the logical and philosophical works and an annotated bibliography
 

 
980s births
1037 deaths
11th-century astronomers
11th-century Persian-language poets
11th-century philosophers
11th-century Iranian physicians
Alchemists of the medieval Islamic world
Aristotelian philosophers
Burials in Iran
Buyid viziers
Classical humanists
Critics of atheism
Epistemologists
Iranian music theorists
Islamic philosophers
Transoxanian Islamic scholars
Logicians
People from Bukhara Region
Pharmacologists of medieval Iran
Metaphysicians
Musical theorists of the medieval Islamic world
Ontologists
People from Khorasan
Persian physicists
Philosophers of logic
Philosophers of mind
Philosophers of psychology
Philosophers of religion
Philosophers of science
Samanid scholars
Unani medicine
Iranian logicians
Iranian ethicists
Samanid officials
Philosophers of mathematics